Milton R. Brunson (June 28, 1929 – April 1, 1997) was an American gospel musician and former pastor and music director of Christ Tabernacle Baptist Church in Chicago, Illinois. Brunson released his first musical project in 1988, Available to You. The title track has become a gospel standard.

He won a Grammy Award for Best Gospel Choir or Chorus Album at the 37th Annual Grammy Awards, while he was nominated two other times. He had ten albums that have charted on the Billboard Gospel Albums chart over the course of his career and some even after his death. He received a nomination for the Best Gospel Album, Group or Choir at the 1988 Soul Train Music Awards and for Best Gospel Album at the 1993 Soul Train Music Awards.

Biography

Early life 
Brunson was born on June 28, 1929, in Chicago, Illinois. His father was a stockyard worker, while his mother was a music and religion teacher. After he graduated from McKinley High School, he pursued a career in music by getting trained by Thomas A. Dorsey, Mahalia Jackson, and Robert Johnson, to hone his craft in the arts. He eventually became an ordained minister in 1964, and founded, pastored, and was the music director at Christ Tabernacle Baptist Church in Chicago, Illinois.

Career 
His music career started in 1947, at the age of 18 by learning his craft from Thomas A. Dorsey, Mahalia Jackson, and Robert Johnson. After this mentoring process, he started the Thompson Community Singers (nicknamed, "The Tommies"), that appeared on many episodes of the Jubilee Showcase. They even played Grant Park during the Chicago Gospel Music Festival and at the Apollo Theater and at Madison Square Garden in New York City. This got them enough recognition to play in England, Italy, and many other countries around the globe. Brunson and the Thompson Community Singers released twenty-two musical projects, and a few of those were released posthumously. Ten albums got charted on the Billboard Gospel Albums chart, with five of them achieving the top spot on the chart. They received numerous accolades ranging from a nomination for the Best Gospel Album, Group or Choir at the 1988 Soul Train Music Awards and for Best Gospel Album at the 1993 Soul Train Music Awards. In addition, they won a Grammy Award for Best Gospel Choir or Chorus Album at the 37th Annual Grammy Awards, while they were nominated two other times. The Thompson Community Singers boasts some notable alumni particularly, Darius Brooks, Ricky Dillard, and Jessy Dixon.

Death 
Brunson died at his residence in Chicago, Illinois on April 1, 1997. He is interred at Oakridge Cemetery in Hillside, Illinois.

Personal life
Brunson was married to Joann Brunson. They had three children together, two daughters, Donna Louise and Lavitia, and a son, Kevin.

Legacy 
His last album, When You Get High on Jesus, Oh My God, released in 1997 by Hob Records, was a posthumous release. He has a post office branch and school named after him in Austin, Illinois, a neighborhood on Chicago's West Side.

Discography

References

1929 births
1997 deaths
African-American songwriters
African-American Christians
Musicians from Chicago
Songwriters from Illinois
20th-century African-American people